The 2021 Greek Basketball Super Cup is the 2nd edition of the revived Greek professional domestic basketball super cup competition, under the auspices of the Hellenic Basketball Clubs Association (HEBA), and the 3rd overall. The Greek Basketball Super Cup had been played only twice before, in 1986 under the auspices of the Hellenic Basketball Federation (E.O.K.) and 2020. All games were hosted in Dimitris Tofalos Arena in Patras, Greece.

Panathinaikos OPAP won the 2021 Super Cup.

Format
The competition will be played in a final-four format and single elimination games, between the teams placed in the four first places of the 2020–21 Greek Basket League, which include the 2020–21 Greek Basketball Cup winner and finalist.

Qualified Teams
The following four teams qualified for the tournament.

Bracket

References

External links
 Official Hellenic Basketball Federation Site 
 Official Greek Basket League Site 

Greek Basketball Super Cup
2021–22 in Greek basketball